Flex-Deon Blake (born Kevin Lorenzo Moss; April 25, 1962 – March 1, 2021) was an American gay pornographic actor who has appeared in gay pornographic films, gay XD pornographic magazines, and on websites. He starred in several bareback productions, including the controversial film Niggas' Revenge. In 2004, he was inducted into the Grabby Awards "Wall of Fame."

Early life and education
Blake joined the US Air Force after high school, serving for 13 years until he was honorably discharged in 1992. He then pursued a degree in piano at Florida A&M University before finding employment as a correctional officer.

Gay pornographic career
According to the Internet Movie Database, between 1995 and 2005 Flex-Deon Blake appeared in 42 gay pornographic films  This list includes mainstream productions such as Bacchus's Black Workout 10 as well as more controversial movies, such as SX Video's Barebacking with Jeff Palmer, vol. 3, in which Blake co-starred with the well-known gay performer Jeff Palmer. In 2001, Blake appeared in Dick Wadd's film Niggas' Revenge, which the Dick Wadd website describes as "a film so controversial that many stores won't carry it." Niggas' Revenge enacts the rape and sexual humiliation of a group of neo-Nazi skinheads by three African-American brothers whose rage the neo-Nazis provoked by their racist actions.

As a subject of Gay Studies
The film Niggas' Revenge, and Flex-Deon Blake's role in it, have become the subject of academic discussion. In his book, Unlimited Intimacy: Reflections on the Subculture of Barebacking, Tim Dean, a professor at the University at Buffalo, treats Niggas' Revenge in detail because of the way in which it fetishizes the simultaneous transgression of a number of taboos, all in order, Dean argues, to "conjure the transgressive charge of unprotected anal sex among gay men." The representation of interracial sex, rape, violence, and incest (between Chris Blake and Bobby Blake) is enhanced by what Dean calls Flex-Deon Blake's "phallicized" appearance:

Personal life
Flex-Deon Blake was the long-term partner of the well-known black gay pornographic actor Bobby Blake. The latter referred Flex-Deon to the adult industry producer Edward James. The story is part of Bobby's book, My Life in Porn. Flex-Deon Blake, in rediscovering his Christian roots, founded the Dallas-based "BrothasNDaSpirit", a ministry that helps all people resolve any conflict between Christian spirituality and someone's sexual orientation.

Flex-Deon Blake died in March 2021 at the age of 58.

See also
 List of male performers in gay porn films

References

Further reading
 Bobby Blake with John R. Gordon, My Life in Porn: The Bobby Blake Story (Philadelphia: Running Press, 2008), .
 Tim Dean, Unlimited Intimacy: Reflections on the Subculture of Barebacking (Chicago and London: University of Chicago Press, 2009),  (hard cover), 978-0226-13939-5 (paper).
 Owen Keehnen, More Starz (Herndon, Va.: STARbooks Press, 2007), pp. 90–2, .

External links 

 
 
 

1962 births
2021 deaths
African-American Christians
African-American pornographic film actors
American LGBT military personnel
American male adult models
American male pornographic film actors
LGBT African Americans
Male actors from Miami
Military personnel from Florida
Florida A&M University alumni
Gay models
Pornographic film actors from Florida
Male adult models
LGBT adult models
LGBT Christians
LGBT people from Florida
LGBT pornographic film actors
United States Air Force airmen
20th-century African-American people
21st-century African-American people